Jan von Koss (born 26 September 1945) is a Norwegian épée fencer. He competed at the 1968 and 1972 Summer Olympics.

References

External links

1945 births
Living people
Norwegian male épée fencers
Olympic fencers of Norway
Fencers at the 1968 Summer Olympics
Fencers at the 1972 Summer Olympics
Sportspeople from Oslo
20th-century Norwegian people